Chartwell Leisure was an American hotel company. It was formed in 1994 as National Gaming, a spin-off of the gaming businesses of Hospitality Franchise Systems (HFS). A year later, after finding little success, the company said it was leaving the casino industry, and would seek to acquire a business in a less risky field.

In January 1996, the company changed its name to National Lodging, and paid $98 million to buy 16 Travelodge hotels and joint venture interests in 96 more from Forte, as part of a deal that also saw HFS acquire the Travelodge trademark and franchise operation. In August, the company was renamed Chartwell Leisure after taking a $57 million investment from groups affiliated with the Fisher family, the Gordon Getty family, and the de Gunzburg family, giving them a total 52 percent stake in the firm.

In March 1998, the company was acquired by a partnership of Whitehall Street Real Estate (a Goldman Sachs affiliate) and Westmont Hospitality Group for $349 million, including $77 million in assumed debt. Westmont received a minority share, and took over operations of the company's 124 properties, under the new name WW Leisure.

References

External links
 BusinessWeek profile of Chartwell Leisure

Defunct hotels
Defunct gambling companies
Gambling companies of the United States
Hotel chains in the United States
Defunct companies based in New York City
American companies established in 1994
Hospitality companies established in 1994
Hotels disestablished in 1998
Corporate spin-offs
1998 mergers and acquisitions
Gambling companies established in 1994
Gambling companies disestablished in 1998